Sunkist Growers, Incorporated is an American  citrus growers' non-stock membership cooperative composed of 6,000 members from California and Arizona. It is currently headquartered in Valencia, California. Through 31 offices in the United States and Canada and four offices outside North America, its sales in 1991 totaled $956 million. It is the largest fresh produce shipper in the United States, the most diversified citrus processing and marketing operation in the world, and one of California's largest landowners.

History

In the late 1880s, California citrus growers began organizing themselves into cooperatives, with the goal of increasing profits by pooling their risk and increasing their collective bargaining power with jobbers and packers. The economic depression that began in 1893 worsened farmers' situations, and intensified their desire to self-organize to their own benefit.

In 1893, P.J. Dreher and his son, the "father of the California citrus industry" Edward L. Dreher (1877–1964), and several other prominent citrus farmers and land owners formed the Southern California Fruit Exchange in Claremont, a small college town near Los Angeles. It originally represented only growers of oranges: in 1896 lemon growers joined as well.  The exchange initially included growers from Los Angeles County, Orange County, and Riverside County, and later expanded to growers and groves in San Bernardino County and Ventura County. By 1905, the group represented 5,000 members, 45% of the California citrus industry, and renamed itself the California Fruit Growers Exchange. In 1952, it changed its name to Sunkist Growers, Inc.

Organizational structure

Sunkist has three levels of organizational hierarchy: local, district, and central associations. Individual growers belong to a local organization; local organizations belong to a district organization, and district organizations belong to a central organization. The main purpose of the cooperative is to create systems enabling fruit from multiple growers to be efficiently harvested, sorted into various sizes and grades, and packed and shipped across the United States, in response to shifting demand.

Since inception, the organization has significantly expanded its activities. In 1906, the CFGE launched the Citrus Protective League, a lobbying arm. In 1907, it formed the Fruit Growers Supply Company to supply growers with materials such as radios, tires, shooks for fruit crates, insecticides, and fertilizers at wholesale prices. It later formed the Sunkist's Exchange By-Products Company, which developed markets for products such as citric acid, sodium citrate, lemon oil, pectin, orange oil and orange pulp.

The Sunkist brand

In its early years, the primary problem facing the California citrus industry was an oversupply of fruit. By 1907, California was producing five times the quantity of oranges it had been fifteen years earlier, and orange production was continuing to grow as newly planted orange groves began to bear fruit. In response, in 1907 the CFGE approved the first-ever large-scale advertising campaign aimed at advertising a perishable commodity. The March 1907 campaign, which marketed oranges to Iowans as "healthy" and "summery," resulted in a 50% increase of orange sales in that state. It also launched the Sunkist brand: the ad agency Lord & Thomas originally proposed using the adjective "sun-kissed" to describe the CFGE oranges; the word eventually used in the campaign was Sunkist, made up by the agency so it would be easier to defend afterwards as a trademark.

In an effort to distinguish Sunkist oranges from others, the CFGE wrapped its oranges in paper stamped with the Sunkist brand. But in 1909, after Sunkist learned that merchants were selling non-Sunkist oranges as Sunkist, it began to offer consumers a free Sunkist-branded spoon in exchange for mailing in twelve Sunkist wrappers. One million spoons were claimed in the first year of the promotion, further establishing the brand in consumers' minds and giving merchants a reason to want to display Sunkist oranges in their original wrappers. By 1910, the promotion had resulted in Sunkist becoming the world's largest purchaser of cutlery.

The success of early campaigns prompted Sunkist to invest heavily in advertising, and in coming decades the brand was advertised in magazines and on radio, on billboards, streetcars and railroad cars, on the sides of speedboats, in school curricula and essay contests, and in pamphlets distributed in doctors' offices. Its messaging aimed to reposition oranges in the minds of consumers. Rather than being seen as a luxury to be enjoyed only at Christmas, Sunkist wanted people to see oranges as essential for good health, and to eat one every day.

Sunkist also invested in marketing fresh-squeezed orange juice and lemonade as superior alternatives to "artificial" beverages such as Coca-Cola. By the mid-1930s, one Sunkist orange in five was being consumed in juice form, often at soda fountains, and Sunkist juice was the second-most-popular soda fountain drink, after Coca-Cola.

By 1914, Americans were consuming about forty oranges per person every year, up 80% from 1885.

In 1915, in response to competition from imported Italian lemons, which at that time had nearly half the American market, Sunkist started aggressively marketing the benefits of Sunkist lemons, promoting their use as a hair rinse, in tea, in pie and as a food garnish. By 1924, California lemons had 90% of the American lemon market.

Today

As of 2007, Sunkist markets fresh oranges, lemons, limes, grapefruits, tangerines and strawberries to 12 states and three Canadian provinces, from 6,000 growers in California and Arizona. From 1971 to 2014, Sunkist was based in the Sherman Oaks district of Los Angeles; in September 2014, it relocated to the Valencia neighborhood of Santa Clarita, California. Through licensing agreements, Sunkist has rented its trademark to other firms such as General Mills and Snapple, for marketing more than 600 mainly citrus-flavoured products including soft drinks and juice drinks, vitamins, and jellies and candies, in more than 50 countries. It also owns two citrus processing plants which manufacture juice, oils, pulp and peels. Sunkist's subsidiaries for marketing, international sales and fruit purchasing include SunMac Hawaii Ltd., Sunkist Global, LLC in California, Sunkist Pacific, Ltd., in Japan, Sunkist (Far East) Promotion Ltd., in Hong Kong, and Sunkist Real Estate Ltd., in California. Sales in 1991 totalled $956 million, with nearly half of revenues generated outside the United States.

Examples of Sunkist trademark licensing
 Sunkist soft drinks including the orange-flavored "Sunkist Orange Soda" and other fruit-flavored sodas, are produced by Dr Pepper Snapple Group under license from Sunkist Growers; see Sunkist (soft drink). (US)
 "Sunkist Fruit Gems" are a soft fruit candy produced by Jelly Belly under license from Sunkist. Jelly Belly acquired the former producer, Ben Myerson Candy Company. (US & Canada)
 "Sunkist Fruit Snacks", "Sunkist Fruit & Grain Bars", and "Sunkist Baking Mixes" are marketed by General Mills (US)
 "Sunkist NFC Orange Juice and Juice Drinks" are products of A. Lassonde (Canada)
 "Sunkist Fruit First Fruit Snacks" are products of Ganong Bros. (Canada)
 "Sunkist Vitamin C & Supplements" are products of WN Pharmaceuticals (Canada)
 Sunkist juice and juice drinks can be found in Japan, South Korea, Hong Kong, Indonesia, Malaysia, several Persian Gulf countries, Belgium, Malta, Austria, and other countries.

See also 
 Redlands, California

References

External links
 Official site
 Sunkist label, UCLA Digital Library

Agricultural marketing cooperatives
Agriculture in California
Orange production
Companies based in Los Angeles
History of California
History of Southern California
History of Greater Los Angeles
Food and drink companies established in 1893
1893 establishments in California
19th century in Los Angeles
Agricultural cooperatives in the United States